L'Aquila earthquake may refer to:

 1461 L'Aquila earthquake
 1703 L'Aquila earthquake
 2009 L'Aquila earthquake

See also
List of earthquakes in Italy